Mnaseas is a genus of skipper butterflies in the family Hesperiidae.

Species
Recognised species in the genus Mnaseas include:
 Mnaseas bicolor (Mabille, 1889)
 Mnaseas bryna (Evans, 1955)
 Mnaseas derasa (Herrich-Schäffer, 1870)
 Mnaseas evansi (Mielke, 1972)
 Mnaseas inca Bell, 1930
 Mnaseas kayei Bell, [1932]
 Mnaseas macia  Evans, [1955]
 Mnaseas mapirica Bell, 1930
 Mnaseas pandora Lindsey, 1925
 Mnaseas sirene Mabille, 1904

References

External links
Natural History Museum Lepidoptera genus database

Hesperiinae
Hesperiidae genera